WPTN (780 AM, "106.1 The Eagle") is a radio station broadcasting a classic hits format. Licensed to Cookeville, Tennessee, United States, the station serves the Cookeville area. The station is owned by Cookeville Communications, LLC. Because WPTN broadcasts on the same frequency as "clear–channel" station WBBM in Chicago, Illinois, it only broadcasts during the daytime hours and is required to sign off at sunset.

History
WPTN is formerly a Top 40 station for the area in the 1980s. On November 3, 2017, WPTN changed their format from sports to classic hits, still branded as "106.1 The Eagle".

Previous logo

References

External links

Classic hits radio stations in the United States
PTN
Putnam County, Tennessee
Radio stations established in 1962
1962 establishments in Tennessee
PTN